The 2016 Fergana Challenger was a professional tennis tournament played on hard courts. It was the 17th edition of the tournament for men which was part of the 2016 ATP Challenger Tour, offering a total of $50,000 in prize money, and the sixth edition of the event for women on the 2016 ITF Women's Circuit, offering a total of $25,000 in prize money. It took place in Fergana, Uzbekistan, on 13–19 June 2016.

Men's singles main draw entrants

Seeds 

 1 Rankings as of 6 June 2016.

Other entrants 
The following players received wildcards into the singles main draw:
  Sanjar Fayziev
  Jurabek Karimov
  Shonigmatjon Shofayziyev
  Khumoun Sultanov

The following players received entry from the qualifying draw:
  Alessandro Bega 
  Chen Ti 
  Anton Zaitcev 
  Dzmitry Zhyrmont

Women's singles main draw entrants

Seeds 

 1 Rankings as of 6 June 2016.

Other entrants 
The following players received wildcards into the singles main draw:
  Gozal Ainitdinova
  Shakhnoza Khatamova
  Sarvinoz Saidhujaeva
  Guzal Yusupova

The following players received entry from the qualifying draw:
  Yuliya Kalabina 
  Veronika Kapshay 
  Varvara Kuznetsova 
  Polina Merenkova 
  Polina Monova
  Alexandra Riley 
  Jamilya Sadykzhanova
  Komola Umarova

The following player received entry by a junior exempt:
  Tereza Mihalíková

Champions

Men's singles 

  Radu Albot def.  Konstantin Kravchuk, 6–4, 6–2

Women's singles 
  Polina Monova def.  Sabina Sharipova, 6–3, 0–6, 6–4

Men's doubles 

  Yannick Jankovits /  Luca Margaroli def.  Toshihide Matsui /  Vishnu Vardhan, 6–4, 7–6(7–4)

Women's doubles 
  Polina Monova /  Yana Sizikova def.  Prerna Bhambri /  Ankita Raina, 7–6(7–0), 6–2

References

External links 
 Official website

2016 ATP Challenger Tour
2016 ITF Women's Circuit
2016